Air Marshal Peter William David Ruddock,  (born 5 February 1954) is a former senior commander in the Royal Air Force who served as Air Secretary from 2004 to 2006.

RAF career
Ruddock joined the Royal Air Force in 1974. He was appointed Officer Commanding the Operations Wing at RAF Coningsby in 1993, assistant director of the Defence Intelligence Staff in 1996, Station Commander at RAF Coningsby in 1999 and then Air Commodore Defensive Operations at Headquarters No. 1 Group in 2000. He became Director of Staff Duties in 2002 and Air Secretary in 2004 before moving on to be Director-General of the Saudi Arabia Armed Forces Project in 2006.

He retired in 2011 and became Business Development Director at Lockheed Martin UK.

References

1954 births
Commanders of the Order of the British Empire
Companions of the Order of the Bath
Living people
Officers of the Legion of Merit
Royal Air Force air marshals
Royal Air Force personnel of the Iraq War
Royal Air Force personnel of the War in Afghanistan (2001–2021)